Monroe Comprehensive High School (MCHS) is a four-year secondary school located in Albany, Georgia, United States. It is one of three high schools in the Dougherty County School System, which also includes Dougherty Comprehensive High School and Westover Comprehensive High School.

MCHS is a comprehensive high school that offers both academic and vocational studies. Students may select from college preparatory or technical career programs of study. Programs are provided for the accelerated, the gifted and students with learning disabilities as well as students needing remedial help. Four AP courses and four languages are offered, and six vocational programs are involved in the process of achieving industry certification, with more technology being added to help motivate students.

Alma mater
(To the tune of "O Danny Boy")
O' Monroe High, your halls are brightly shining
From door to door, and on the campus green;
Our hearts will ere be true to thee
Dear Monroe High, to honor thee forever
Faithfully, through all the years
Your fame will last forever
To lead us on to higher destiny
And we will praise the green and gold forever;
O' Monroe High, Dear Monroe High,
We Love You So!

Notable alumni
 Deion Branch - former NFL wide receiver and Super Bowl XXXIX MVP with the New England Patriots
 Alice Coachman - first black woman to win an Olympic gold medal (Madison High alum)
 Gary Ellerson - former NFL running back with the Green Bay Packers
 McCree Harris  - Retired Teacher MCHS - Freedom Fighter in the Albany Movement
 Field Mob - Gold-selling hip-hop artists
 Emarlos Leroy - former NFL defensive tackle with the Jacksonville Jaguars
 Ricardo Lockette - former NFL wide receiver and Super Bowl champion with the Seattle Seahawks
 Anthony Maddox - former NFL defensive tackle with the Houston Texans
 Markco Maddox - former NFL defensive back with the Minnesota Vikings
 Derrick Moore - former NFL running back with the Detroit Lions
 Bernice Johnson Reagon - Original Freedom Singer SNCC The Freedom Singers - Founder Sweet Honey in the Rock

References

External links
 Monroe Comprehensive High School
 Dougherty County School System
 Georgia School Reports: Monroe Comprehensive High School

Public high schools in Georgia (U.S. state)
Educational institutions established in 1940
Charter schools in Georgia (U.S. state)
1940 establishments in Georgia (U.S. state)
Schools in Dougherty County, Georgia
Buildings and structures in Albany, Georgia